Catleugh is a surname. Notable people with the surname include:

George Catleugh (1932–1996), British footballer
J. D. H. Catleugh (1920–2009), British abstract artist

English-language surnames